Shut Your Mouth and Open Your Eyes is the third studio album by American punk rock band AFI. It was released on November 11, 1997, through Nitro Records.

Overview
This is the first album to feature bassist Hunter Burgan, although he was not a permanent member of AFI at the time, as well as the final album to feature founding guitarist Mark Stopholese. Burgan was offered about $500 to play on the album, but he requested $666. Future band member Jade Puget performed backing vocals for the album as well, making the album the first to feature AFI's current lineup. Nick 13 from American psychobilly band Tiger Army is featured on the track "A Single Second", performing vocals on the chorus.

The phrase "a fire inside", the band's current moniker, is sung in the introductory track, "Keeping Out of Direct Sunlight". This is the first album to be copyrighted to A Fire Inside.

A music video directed by Darren Doane and Ken Daurio was made for the track "Third Season". It features the band sitting in a suburban town while a slew of children chase an ice cream truck. Besides this song, references to the number three are made in the names of three other tracks: "Three Reasons", "Three Seconds Notice" and "Triple Zero".

Artwork 

The album art was largely composited from a 1929 children's magic set. The band name appears in a Roman font, while the album title is italicized and stylized in lower case except the first letter of the first word. The black, yellow and reddish cover features the head and shoulders of a young man wearing a suit, a patterned red carpet over three stairs, above which a figure levitates between a pair of potted flames. At the bottom corner is a small crawling red devil.

Two red devils appear in the liner notes (one a human wearing a cape which also appears on the back cover). Beneath the lyrics are silhouettes of raised hands. A maniacally smiling man-devil's face appears on the red-and-black CD label. The inner edge of the album's CD case reveals the hidden message "a fire inside". Behind the CD tray is an achromatic illustration of a man in suit and shorts, illuminated in white, twisting a skeleton key to a huge lock, which has been keeping some dark doorway shut.

Reception

Track listing

Personnel
Credits adapted from liner notes.

 AFI – producer
 Hunter Burgan – bass, programming, keyboards, backing vocals
 Adam Carson – drums, backing vocals
 Andy Ernst – engineer
 Davey Havok – lead vocals
 Mark Stopholese – lead guitar, backing vocals
 Nick 13 – rhythm guitar, backing vocals; harmony vocals 
 Jade Puget – additional guitar, additional programming, additional keyboard, backing vocals
 Eddy Shreyer – masterering

Studios
 Recorded at Art of Ears, Hayward, CA
 Mastered at Oasis

References

1997 albums
AFI (band) albums
Nitro Records albums